2004 in sports describes the year's events in world sport.

American football
 Super Bowl XXXVIII – the New England Patriots (AFC) won 32–29 over the Carolina Panthers (NFC)
Location: Reliant Stadium
Attendance: 71,525
MVP: Tom Brady, QB (New England)
 Sugar Bowl (2003 season):
 The Louisiana State Tigers won 21–14 over the Oklahoma Sooners to win the BCS National Championship
 Rose Bowl (2003 season):
 The Southern California Trojans won 28–14 over the Michigan Wolverines to win the AP Poll national championship
 August 8 – John Elway, Barry Sanders, Carl Eller and Bob Brown are inducted into the Pro Football Hall of Fame
 September 19 – Jerry Rice's record of 274 consecutive games with a pass reception comes to an end, although his Oakland Raiders defeat the Buffalo Bills, 13–10.
 September 26 – After Pittsburgh Steelers journeyman quarterback Tommy Maddox suffered an elbow injury during the 2nd game of the season, rookie quarterback Ben Roethlisberger, the 11th pick in the 2004 NFL Draft made his first professional start in a Week 3 game vs the Miami Dolphins, a 13–3 win for the Steelers. Roethlisberger would start the remainder of the season and went 13-0 as a starter, the best start for a rookie quarterback since the 1970 AFL-NFL merger. The Steelers' impressive run would come to an end when they lost to the eventual Super Bowl champion New England Patriots 27–41 in the AFC Championship Game. This season marked the beginning of a new era for the Steelers, as Roethlisberger would lead them to 3 Super Bowl appearances, winning 2 of them. The Steelers also haven't had a losing record since this season as of 2020.
 September 27 – Morten Andersen appears in his 341st NFL game, breaking the record set by George Blanda.
 December 26 – Peyton Manning threw his 49th touchdown pass of the season in a game against the San Diego Chargers breaking Dan Marino's single season touchdown record

Association football

February 14 – Tunisia beat Morocco 2–1 to clinch the first African Cup of Nations in the country's history.
May 15 – Arsenal complete their last game of the Premier League season with a victory, becoming the first team to go unbeaten for a whole season in the top division of English football since Preston North End in 1889.
May 26 – Porto defeat AS Monaco 3–0 in the UEFA Champions League Final in Gelsenkirchen, Germany.
April 28 – San Marino record their first international victory, defeating Liechtenstein 1–0.
July 4 – Greece surprisingly win the UEFA Euro 2004 football tournament, defeating the host nation Portugal 1–0.
July 25 – Brazil win the Copa América football tournament, defeating Argentina 4–2 on penalties.
August 7 – Japan win the 2004 Asian Cup football tournament, defeating China 3–1.
August 26 – United States win the Olympic women's football tournament, defeating Brazil 2–1 in extra time.
August 28 – Argentina win the Olympic men's football tournament, defeating Paraguay 1–0.
September 20 – death of Brian Clough, 69, English manager who won successive European Cups in 1979 and 1980 as manager of Nottingham Forest
October 27 – death of Serginho, 30, Brazilian player who suffered a fatal heart attack during a Campeonato Brasileiro match
December 17 – Boca Juniors defeats Bolívar 2–1 on aggregate to win the Copa Sudamericana final in Buenos Aires

Athletics

 August – Athletics at the 2004 Summer Olympics held at Athens

Australian rules football
 Australian Football League
 Port Adelaide wins the 108th AFL premiership (Port Adelaide 17.11 (113) d Brisbane Lions 10.13 (73))
 Brownlow Medal awarded to Chris Judd (West Coast Eagles)
 See also 2004 AFL season

Baseball

June 27 College World Series – Cal State Fullerton wins the NCAA College World Series, defeating Texas 3–2 to win the best-of-three championship series 2–0.
September 17 – At San Francisco, Barry Bonds becomes just the third player in MLB history to hit 700 home runs. Bonds joined the select company of Hall of Famers Hank Aaron (755) and Babe Ruth (714) with his historic blast off San Diego Padres Jake Peavy in the third inning.
September 17 – At Seattle, Ichiro Suzuki hits his 199th single of the season, breaking the major league baseball record of 198, set by Lloyd Waner in 1927.
September 29 – Major League Baseball announces that the Montreal Expos will be moved to the Washington, D.C. area for the 2005 season.
October 1 – Ichiro Suzuki of the Seattle Mariners gets two base hits to break the 83-year-old record for most hits in a single season. The previous record, held by George Sisler, was 257 hits in a season.
October 25 – The Seibu Lions win the Japan Series with a 4–3 series win over the Chunichi Dragons.
October 27 – The Boston Red Sox sweep the St. Louis Cardinals, four games to none, to win the World Series for the first time in 86 years.
October 29 – Tohoku Eagles officially founded in Sendai, Japan.

Basketball

 NBA Finals – The Detroit Pistons, in a major upset, defeat the heavily favored Los Angeles Lakers, 4 games to 1. It is the Pistons first NBA title in fourteen years, and the third in franchise history.
 WNBA Finals – The Seattle Storm defeat the Connecticut Sun in three games.
 NCAA Men's Basketball Championship
 The Connecticut Huskies win 82–73 over the Georgia Tech Yellow Jackets. UConn's Emeka Okafor is named Most Outstanding Player of the Final Four.
 NCAA Women's Basketball Championship
 The following day, the UConn women follow suit, defeating the Tennessee Lady Volunteers 70–61, making UConn the first school to win both the NCAA Division I men's and women's basketball championships in the same season.  UConn's Diana Taurasi is named the Most Outstanding Player of the Final Four.
 Euroleague – Maccabi Tel Aviv of Israel wins the final 118–74 over Fortitudo Bologna of Italy.
 Chinese Basketball Association finals: Guangdong Southern Tigers defeat Bayi Rockets, 3 games to 1.
 National Basketball League (Australia) – Sydney Kings defeated the West Sydney Razorbacks 3–2 in best-of-five final series.

Boxing
 February 19 to February 29 – 35th European Amateur Boxing Championships held in Pula, Croatia
 March 13 – World Junior Middleweight Championship unified as Shane Mosley lost to Winky Wright.
 May 15 – Antonio Tarver won the WBC light-heavyweight title with a second-round knockout of champion Roy Jones Jr.
 July 30 – Danny Williams knocks out Mike Tyson in the fourth round of a non-championship bout.
 August 16 – Robert Quiroga, former International Boxing Federation super flyweight champion, found stabbed to death.
 September 18 – Bernard Hopkins successfully defends his undisputed middleweight title with a ninth-round knockout of Oscar De La Hoya.

Canadian football
 November 21 – the Toronto Argonauts win the 92nd Grey Cup game, defeating the BC Lions 27–19 at Frank Clair Stadium in Ottawa.

Cricket
 March 12 – Shane Warne becomes the first spinner in history to take 500 Test wickets
 March 13 – India beat Pakistan in the highest scoring One Day International ever (693 runs), in the opening match of their first Pakistan tour since 1989
 April 2 – Zimbabwe Cricket Union announces the retirement of Heath Streak as captain of Zimbabwe. It is later revealed he was sacked, and 15 senior players withdraw from Zimbabwean cricket, citing political interference by Robert Mugabe's government in team selection.
 April 12 – West Indies' Brian Lara regains the individual Test innings record from Matthew Hayden with 400 not out in the fourth Test against England in St. John's, Antigua
 May 8 – Sri Lanka's Muttiah Muralitharan breaks Courtney Walsh's world record of 519 Test wickets with his 520th wicket against Zimbabwe in Harare
 June 10 – Zimbabwe Cricket Union agrees to abandon any further Test matches in 2004, under pressure from International Cricket Council over substandard teams due to 15 striking players.
 September 10 – September 25 – ICC Champions Trophy in England – West Indies beats England in the final.

Curling
 2004 Ford World Curling Championship
 Women's Final: (April 24) Canada (Colleen Jones) 8-4 Norway (Dordi Nordby)
 Men's Final: (April 25) Sweden (Peja Lindholm) 7-6 Germany (Sebastian Stock)

Cycle racing
Road bicycle racing
 Giro d'Italia won by Damiano Cunego of Italy. Sprinter Alessandro Petacchi wins nine stages. See 2004 Giro d'Italia
 Tour de France won by Lance Armstrong, his record-setting sixth consecutive title.
Cyclo-cross
 UCI Cyclo-cross World Championships
 Men's Competition – Bart Wellens
 Women's Competition – Laurence Leboucher

Field hockey
 Olympic Games (Men's Competition): Australia
 Olympic Games (Women's Competition): Germany
 Men's Champions Trophy: Spain
 Women's Champions Trophy: Netherlands

Figure skating
 World Figure Skating Championships
 Men's champion: Evgeni Plushenko, Russia
 Ladies' champion: Shizuka Arakawa, Japan
 Pair skating champions: Tatiana Totmianina and Maxim Marinin, Russia
 Ice dancing champions: Tatiana Navka and Roman Kostomarov, Russia

Floorball
 Men's World Floorball Championships
 Champion: Sweden defeated the Czech Republic 6:4
 Women's under-19 World Floorball Championships
 Champion: Sweden
 European Cup
 Men's champion: Pixbo Wallenstam IBK
 Women's champion: SC Classic

Gaelic Athletic Association
 Camogie
 All-Ireland Camogie Champion: Tipperary
 National Camogie League: Tipperary
 Gaelic football
 All-Ireland Senior Football Championship – Kerry 1-20 died Mayo 2-9
 National Football League – Kerry 3-11 died Galway 1-16
 Tommy Murphy Cup – Clare 1-11 died Sligo 0-11
 Ladies' Gaelic football
 All-Ireland Senior Football Champion: Galway
 National Football League: Mayo
 Hurling
 All-Ireland Senior Hurling Championship – Cork 0-17 died Kilkenny 0-9
 National Hurling League – Galway beat Waterford

Gliding
 World Gliding Championships held at Elverum, Norway
 Club Class Winner: Sebastian Kawa, Poland; Glider: SZD-48-3M Brawo

Golf

Men's professional
 Major Championships
 Masters Tournament – Phil Mickelson wins the first major of his career.
 U.S. Open – Retief Goosen wins his second U.S. Open title
 British Open – Todd Hamilton, a virtual unknown, wins at Royal Troon in a playoff over Ernie Els
 PGA Championship – Vijay Singh wins in a three-hole playoff over Chris DiMarco and Justin Leonard.
 Team Europe defeats Team USA 18½ – 9½ to retain the Ryder Cup.
Men's amateur
 British Amateur – Stuart Wilson
 U.S. Amateur – Ryan Moore
 European Amateur – Matthew Richardson
Women's professional
 Kraft Nabisco Championship – Grace Park  wins the first major of the LPGA season, by one shot over 17-year-old Aree Song. Michelle Wie finished fourth, four shots behind Park.
 LPGA Championship – Annika Sörenstam
 U.S. Women's Open – Meg Mallon
 Women's British Open – Karen Stupples
 LPGA Tour money leader – Annika Sörenstam – $2,544,707

Handball
 2004 European Men's Handball Championship: Germany
 2004 European Women's Handball Championship: Norway

Harness racing
 Windsong's Legacy becomes the seventh horse to win the North American Trotting Triple Crown.

Horse racing
Steeplechases
 Cheltenham Gold Cup – Best Mate wins a third consecutive time
 Grand National – Amberleigh House
Flat races
 Australia – Melbourne Cup won by Makybe Diva
 Canada – Queen's Plate won by Niigon
 Dubai – Dubai World Cup won by Pleasantly Perfect	
 France – Prix de l'Arc de Triomphe won by Bago
 Ireland – Irish Derby Stakes won by Grey Swallow
 Japan – Japan Cup won by Zenno Rob Roy
 English Triple Crown Races:
 2,000 Guineas Stakes – Haafhd
 The Derby – North Light
 St. Leger Stakes – Rule of Law
 United States Triple Crown Races:
 Kentucky Derby – Smarty Jones
 Preakness Stakes – Smarty Jones by a record margin of 11½ lengths
 Belmont Stakes – Birdstone
 Breeders' Cup World Thoroughbred Championships:
 Breeders' Cup Classic – Ghostzapper
 Breeders' Cup Distaff – Ashado
 Breeders' Cup Filly & Mare Turf – Ouija Board
 Breeders' Cup Juvenile – Wilko
 Breeders' Cup Juvenile Fillies – Sweet Catomine
 Breeders' Cup Mile – Singletary
 Breeders' Cup Sprint – Speightstown
 Breeders' Cup Turf – Better Talk Now

Ice hockey
 February 12 – An independent audit by Arthur Levitt reveals that National Hockey League teams lost a collective US$273 million in 2003, and suggests the league is "on the road to oblivion."
 2004 Women's World Ice Hockey Championships at Halifax, Nova Scotia – Canada defeats USA 2–0 in the final
 2004 Men's World Ice Hockey Championships held at Prague – Canada defeats Sweden 5–3 in the final
 Stanley Cup – Tampa Bay Lightning defeats Calgary Flames 4 games to 3
 2004 World Cup of Hockey held at Toronto – Canada 3-2 Finland
 September 15 – NHL collective bargaining agreement expires. Commissioner Gary Bettman announces a lockout of NHLPA players.

Kabaddi
 November 21 – India wins the first-ever World Cup kabaddi championship defeating Iran in the final held at Mumbai.

Lacrosse
 February 22 – National Lacrosse League – The East Division All-Stars defeat the West Division All-Stars 19–15 in the All Star Game.
 May 7 – National Lacrosse League – Calgary Roughnecks defeat Buffalo Bandits 14–11 to win Champion's Cup
 May 30 – LeMoyne College defeats Limestone 11-10 (2OT) for first Division II National Championship.
 August – European Lacrosse Championships
 Men's – England defeats Germany
 Women's – Wales A defeats Scotland A
 August 22 – Major League Lacrosse – Philadelphia Barrage defeat Boston Cannons 13–11 to win league championship at Boston
 Clarington Green Gaels win the Founders Cup
 Peterborough Lakers win the Mann Cup
 Burnaby Lakers win the Minto Cup

Mixed martial arts
The following is a list of major noteworthy MMA events during 2004 in chronological order.

|-
|align=center style="border-style: none none solid solid; background: #e3e3e3"|Date
|align=center style="border-style: none none solid solid; background: #e3e3e3"|Event
|align=center style="border-style: none none solid solid; background: #e3e3e3"|Alternate Name/s
|align=center style="border-style: none none solid solid; background: #e3e3e3"|Location
|align=center style="border-style: none none solid solid; background: #e3e3e3"|Attendance
|align=center style="border-style: none none solid solid; background: #e3e3e3"|PPV Buyrate
|align=center style="border-style: none none solid solid; background: #e3e3e3"|Notes
|-align=center
|January 16
|WEC 9: Cold Blooded
|
| Lemoore, California, United States
|
|
|
|-align=center
|January 31
|UFC 46: Supernatural
|
| Las Vegas, United States
|10,700
|80,000
|
|-align=center
|February 1
|Pride 27: Inferno
|
| Osaka, Japan
|13,366
|
|
|-align=center
|February 15
|Pride Bushido 2
|
| Yokohama, Japan
|
|
|
|-align=center
|March 14
|K-1 Beast 2004 in Niigata
|
| Niigata, Japan
|
|
|
|-align=center
|April 2
|UFC 47: It's On!
|
| Las Vegas, Nevada, United States
|11,437
|105,000
|
|-align=center
|April 25
|Pride Total Elimination 2004
|
| Saitama, Japan
|42,110
|
|
|-align=center
|May 21
|WEC 10: Bragging Rights
|
| Lemoore, California, United States
|
|
|
|-align=center
|May 22
|K-1 MMA ROMANEX
|
| Saitama, Japan
|14,918
|
|
|-align=center
|May 23
|Pride Bushido 3
|
| Yokohama, Japan
|
|
|
|-align=center
|June 19
|UFC 48: Payback
|
| Las Vegas, Nevada, United States
|10,000
|110,000
|
|-align=center
|June 20
|Pride Critical Countdown 2004
|
| Saitama, Japan
|43,711
|
|
|-align=center
|July 19
|Pride Bushido 4
|
| Nagoya, Japan
|
|
|
|-align=center
|August 15
|Pride Final Conflict 2004
|
| Saitama, Japan
|47,629
|
|
|-align=center
|August 21
|UFC 49: Unfinished Business
|
| Paradise, Nevada, United States
|12,100
|80,000
|
|-align=center
|October 14
|Pride Bushido 5
|
| Osaka, Japan
|
|
|
|-align=center
|October 21
|WEC 12: Halloween Fury 3
|
| Lemoore, California, United States
|
|
|
|-align=center
|October 22
|UFC 50: The War of '04
|
| Atlantic City, New Jersey, United States
|9,000
|40,000
|
|-align=center
|October 31
|Pride 28: High Octane
|
| Saitama, Japan
|24,028
|
|
|-align=center
|November 20
|K-1 Fighting Network Rumble on the Rock 2004
|
| Honolulu, Hawaii, United States
|13,000
|
|
|-align=center
|December 31
|Pride Shockwave 2004
|
| Saitama, Japan
|48,398
|
|
|-align=center
|December 31
|K-1 PREMIUM 2004 Dynamite!!
|
| Osaka, Japan
|52,918
|
|
|-align=center

Motorsport

Orienteering
 First ever World Championship in Trail Orienteering held September 15–18 in Västerås, Sweden

Netball
 5 July – the reigning world champions, New Zealand's Silver Ferns, complete 3-0 Test series win over Australia with 53–46 win at Hamilton, New Zealand.

Radiosport
 Twelfth Amateur Radio Direction Finding World Championship held in Brno, Czech Republic

Rugby league

 February 13 at Huddersfield, England – 2004 World Club Challenge match is won by the Bradford Bulls 22–4 against Penrith Panthers at Alfred McAlpine Stadium before 18,962
 April 23 at Newcastle, Australia – 2004 ANZAC Test match is won by Australia 37–10 over New Zealand at EnergyAustralia Stadium before 21,537
 May 15 at Millennium Stadium, Cardiff – 2004 Challenge Cup tournament won by St. Helens with a 32–16 win over Wigan Warriors in the final before 73,734.
 June 17 – Martin Gleeson and Sean Long are banned for four and three months respectively after placing bets on their side, St. Helens, to lose a Super League match against the Bradford Bulls
 October 3 – Canterbury Bulldogs defeats Sydney Roosters 16–13 in the Grand Final to win the NRL premiership
 October 16 – Leeds Rhinos defeats Bradford Bulls 16–8 in the Super League Grand Final to become champions of Super League IX
 November 27 – Australia defeats Great Britain 44–4 in the final of the second Tri-Nations competition

Rugby union

 110th Six Nations Championship series is won by France who complete the Grand Slam
 Super 12 Final – ACT Brumbies defeated Crusaders 47-38
 Heineken Cup Final – London Wasps defeated Toulouse 27-20
 Tri Nations Series – South Africa win due to bonus points, after all sides finish with two wins and two losses
 New Zealand retain the Bledisloe Cup

Ski mountaineering
 March – 2004 World Championship of Skimountaineering held at Aran Valley, Spain

Snooker
 World Snooker Championship – Ronnie O'Sullivan beats Graeme Dott 18-8
 World rankings – Ronnie O'Sullivan becomes world number one for 2004-05
October 16 – in a qualifying match for the UK Championship, Jamie Burnett makes a break of 148 against Leo Fernandez and becomes the first player to achieve a break higher than the nominal maximum of 147 in a professional match.

Snowboarding
September 19 – death of Line Oestvold, 26, Norwegian snowboarder, after a crash in training in Chile.

Speed skating
February 7–9 – 2004 World Allround Speed Skating Championships held at Hamar, Norway
 Men's all-around champion: Chad Hedrick (USA) 150.478
 Ladies' all-around champion: Renate Groenewold (Netherlands) 162.573

Swimming
January 13–14 – World Cup (short course) held at Stockholm
January 18 – Yang Yu sets a world record in the women's 200m butterfly (short course) in Berlin with a time of 2:04.04, exactly four years after the previous record was set.
March 25 – Frédérick Bousquet breaks the world record in the men's 50m freestyle (short course) at New York City, clocking 21.10
May 5–16 – 27th European LC Championships held at Madrid
 Russia wins the most medals (16) and Ukraine the most gold medals (9)
August 14–22 – Swimming at the 2004 Summer Olympics held at Athens
 USA wins the most medals (28) and the most gold medals (12)
 (October 7–11) – 7th World Short Course Championships held at Indianapolis
 USA wins the most medals (41) and the most gold medals (21)
December 9–12 – 8th European SC Championships held at Vienna
 Germany wins the most medals (22) and the most gold medals (9)

Tennis

 Australian Open
 Men's Final: Roger Federer defeats Marat Safin, 7-6(7-3) 6-4 6-2
 Women's Final: Justine Henin-Hardenne defeats Kim Clijsters, 6-3 4-6 6-3
 French Open
 Men's Final: Gastón Gaudio defeats Guillermo Coria 0-6 3-6 6-4 6-1 8-6
 Women's Final: Anastasia Myskina defeats Elena Dementieva 6-1 6-2
 Wimbledon Championships
 Men's Final: Roger Federer defeats Andy Roddick, 4-6 7-5 7-6(7-3) 6-3
 Ladies' Final: Maria Sharapova defeats Serena Williams, 6-1 6-4
 U.S. Open
 Men's Final: Roger Federer defeats Lleyton Hewitt 6-0 7-6 (7-3) 6-0
 Women's Final: Svetlana Kuznetsova defeats Elena Dementieva 6-3 7-5
 2004 Summer Olympics
 Men's Singles Competition: Nicolás Massú
 Women's Singles Competition: Justine Henin-Hardenne
 Men's Doubles Competition: Fernando González & Nicolás Massú
 Women's Doubles Competition: Li Ting & Sun Tiantian

Volleyball
 Volleyball at the 2004 Summer Olympics – Men's volleyball: Brazil
 Volleyball at the 2004 Summer Olympics – Women's volleyball: China
 Men's World League: Brazil
 Women's World Grand Prix: Brazil

Water polo
 2004 FINA Men's Water Polo World League: Hungary
 2004 FINA Women's Water Polo World League: USA

Wrestling
 WWE March 14, 2004 – At WrestleMania XX, Chris Benoit defeated Triple H and Shawn Michaels to capture the World Heavyweight Championship when he submitted Triple H to the Crippler Crossface submission hold

Multi-sport events
 2004 Summer Olympics held from August 13 to August 29 in Athens.  Leading medal winners:

 2004 Summer Paralympics held from September 17 to September 28 in Athens
 10th Pan Arab Games held in Algiers

Awards
 Associated Press Male Athlete of the Year – Lance Armstrong, Cycling
 Associated Press Female Athlete of the Year – Annika Sörenstam, LPGA golf

References

 
Sports by year